Saint Luke is a painting by an artist known as El Greco. The painting is an oil on canvas created sometime around 1610-1614. It is currently held by the Indianapolis Museum of Art in Indianapolis, Indiana.

Analysis
According to the gallery label provided by the Indianapolis Museum of Art:

"During the last decade of his career, El Greco played a major role in popularizing a type of pictorial ensemble known as the Apostolado, or "Apostle Series." A complete Apostolado normally comprises thirteen pictures, with twelve bust-length paintings of Apostles and one of Christ as Savior.

These three paintings [ie Saint Luke, Saint Matthew and Saint Simon - all three in the Indianapolis collection] belong to an incomplete set of nine Apostles from the parish church of Almadrones, a small town in the Spanish province of Guadalajara. The church was badly damaged during the Spanish Civil War (1936–39) and the paintings were removed for safekeeping and eventually sold.".

Provenance
According to the gallery label provided by the Indianapolis Museum of Art:

"Parish church of Almadrones (Guadalajara), Spain, until 1936 or immediately after{1}; removed to the Fuerte of Guadalajara (former convent of San Francisco) until 1941{2}; at the Museo Nacional del Prado, Madrid, for conservation treatment, 1941-45; restituted to the bishopric of Sigüenza in 1945, sold and legally exported in 1952{3}; (Newhouse Galleries, Inc. New York); Dr. G.H.A. Clowes [1877-1958], Indianapolis, in1952{4}; The Clowes Fund Collection, Indianapolis, 1958-present (C10034)".

References

External links 
http://www.metmuseum.org/toah/hd/grec/hd_grec.htm
http://www.britannica.com/EBchecked/topic/244100/El-Greco
http://www.imamuseum.org/art/collections/artwork/st-luke-greco-el-el-greco

Paintings by El Greco
El Greco
Books in art